Natsuka (written: 名塚 or 長束), also read as Nazuka, is a Japanese surname. Notable people with the surname include:

, Japanese freelance voice actress and singer
, Japanese daimyō
, Japanese footballer and manager

Japanese-language surnames